Keith Thomas Medlycott (born 12 May 1965) is an English former cricketer, a left-arm spinner and middle order batsman for Surrey and Northern Transvaal. He is known in the game as "Medders".

First-class career
Medlycott's career in first-class cricket spanned 1984 to 1991, and in List A matches from 1985 to 1991 (but with one final match in 2005).

Of his three first-class centuries, one was made on debut against Cambridge University, whilst another was made in Surrey's record seventh wicket partnership of 262 – with Jack Richards – against Kent in 1987.

International career
Medlycott travelled to the West Indies during England's 1989–90 tour, but did not play in any Test matches. In the winter of 1990 he toured Sri Lanka with the England A team.

Minor level cricket
Medlycott also played for the Minor County Buckinghamshire, appearing for them in one match in the Cheltenham and Gloucester Trophy against Lancashire in 2005, fourteen years after his previous appearance in a List A fixture.

Coaching and administration
At the end of 1991, Medlycott was forced into premature retirement at the age of 26 due to developing a tendency to fail to let go of the ball when bowling, known as the bowling "yips". In 1997 he returned to Surrey as a coach, where he helped secure three County Championship titles and four one-day trophies. He moved on from his position in 2003, and went on to work for the International Cricket Council as a high performance manager for umpires.

In 2007, Medlycott became cricket professional and coach at Reed's School in Cobham, Surrey.

In February 2009, Medlycott was appointed Director of Cricket at Purley Cricket Club. He was also team captain.

References

External links

1965 births
Living people
English cricketers
Surrey cricketers
Buckinghamshire cricketers
English cricket coaches
Marylebone Cricket Club cricketers
Lincolnshire cricketers
Test and County Cricket Board Under-25s XI cricketers